Signal Mountain may refer to:
Signal Mountain (Alberta), a mountain in the Maligne Range in Alberta, Canada
Signal Mountain Wilderness, a protected wilderness area in Maricopa County, Arizona
Mount Wilkinson or Signal Mountain, a mountain near Atlanta, Georgia
Signal Mountain, Tennessee, a town near Chattanooga
Signal Mountain Middle High School
Signal Mountain (Wyoming), a mountain in Grand Teton National Park
Signal Mountain (Vermont), a mountain in Caledonia County, Vermont

See also
 List of peaks named Signal
 Mount Signal, California, a community in the Imperial Valley
 Signal Hill (disambiguation)
 Signal Mountain Lodge, Grand Teton National Park, Wyoming
 Signal Mountain Trail, Grand Teton National Park, Wyoming